Greg Taylor is a Democratic member of the Indiana Senate. He has represented the 33rd District since 2008.  In November 2020, he was elected as the Minority Floor Leader of the Indiana Senate. He serves as a Senior Counsel at MWH Law Group, specializing in municipal finance law.

References

External links
State Senator Greg Taylor official Indiana State Legislature site

 

21st-century African-American politicians
21st-century American politicians
African-American state legislators in Indiana
Indiana lawyers
Democratic Party Indiana state senators
Living people
Year of birth missing (living people)